Masfjorden is a fjord in Masfjorden Municipality in Vestland county, Norway. The innermost part of the fjord splits into two branches at the village of Solheim with the Matrefjorden going to the southeast and the Haugsværfjorden going to the northeast. The village of Matre and the European route E39 highway sits at the innermost part of the fjord.

There are no bridges over the fjord, but there is one regular cable ferry route near the mouth of the fjord in the east.

See also
 List of Norwegian fjords

References

Fjords of Vestland
Masfjorden